The Southern Min Wikipedia (Pe̍h-ōe-jī: Wikipedia Bân-lâm-gú) or Holopedia is the Southern Min edition of Wikipedia, the free encyclopedia. It is the second largest Wikipedia in a variety of Chinese, after Mandarin. Written in Pe̍h-ōe-jī, it mainly uses the Hokkien Taiwanese dialect.

History
The Southern Min Wikipedia was founded as an independent project known as Holopedia (a reference to Hō-ló-oē, a colloquial name for the Southern Min dialect) by Wikipedians Pektiong (Tân Pe̍k-tiong) and Kaihsu (Tè Khái-sū) in 2003. A request was then made at the Wikimedia Foundation's Meta-Wiki to create the Wikipedia project for this language.

ISO code

At the time of creation there was no ISO 639 code for Southern Min, so the founders decided to use "zh-min-nan", which had been registered as an IETF language tag. Now there is an ISO code for Southern Min (nan) and the domain http://nan.wikipedia.org redirects to http://zh-min-nan.wikipedia.org/.

The Southern Min Wikipedia is the only Wikipedia to have two hyphens in the code, although "be-x-old" was formerly used for the Belarusian Wikipedia in classical orthography.

In August 2015, the Wikipedians of Southern Min Wikipedia reached a new consensus to officially use "nan" as the language code; however, the consensus hasn't been executed yet.

See also 
Wikipedia in other varieties of Chinese
Taiwanese Hokkien
Peh-oe-ji

References

External links 

 Southern Min Wikipedia

Wikipedias by language
Chinese online encyclopedias
Wikipedias in Sinitic languages